Nоva is a science fiction novel by American writer Samuel R. Delany and published in 1968. Nominally space opera, it explores the politics and culture of a future where cyborg technology is universal (the novel is one of the precursors to cyberpunk), yet making major decisions can involve using tarot cards. It has strong mythological overtones, relating to both the Grail Quest and Jason's Argonautica for the golden fleece. Nova was nominated for the Hugo Award for Best Novel in 1969. In 1984, David Pringle listed it as one of the 100 best science-fiction novels written since 1949.

After Delany completed Nova at the age of 25, his published output stopped for several years, although his writing continued. Delany completed the first draft of Tides of Lust (author's title, Equinox) in September 1968 (it appeared in 1973). He first completed Hogg in June 1969 (although the novel itself would not appear until 1995). With the publication of his next major novel, Dhalgren (1975), however, his style had moved on in experimental directions notably different from that of his earlier work.

Synopsis
By the year 3172, political power in the galaxy is split between two factions: the older Earth-based Draco and the historically younger Pleiades Federation. Both have interests in the even newer Outer Colonies, where mines produce trace amounts of the prized power source Illyrion, the superheavy material essential to starship travel and terraforming planets.

Caught in a feud between aristocratic and economically powerful families, a scarred and obsessed captain from the Pleiades, Lorq Von Ray, recruits a disparate crew of misfits to aid him in the race with his arch-enemy, Prince Red from Draco's Red Shift Ltd., to gain economic leadership by securing a vastly greater amount of Illyrion directly from the heart of a stellar nova. In doing so, Von Ray will shift the balance of power of the existing galactic order, which will bring about the downfall of the Red family as well as end Earth's dominance over interstellar politics.

As the title indicates, the central metaphor for the novel is a nova: the destructive implosion/explosion of an entire sun, which, paradoxically, while it destroys most of a solar system, also creates new elements. In the book, at the eruption of a nova, not only do the laws of physics break down, but so do the laws of politics and psychology. This idea permeates the entire plot and storyline.

The characters follow a quest plot line, in which they visit several worlds to gain information necessary to achieve their goal, all the while pursued by the Red family.

Although the novel does not indulge the literary experimentation found in Delany's later books, it maintains a high level of innovation. Some chapters end or begin in mid-sentence. Also, the point of view regularly shifts between Lorq, Katin, and the Mouse. Each page in the book carries a header that gives the year and location of the scene on the page itself (e.g., "Draco, Earth, Paris, 3162"). This is useful because of the flashbacks in the long journey around the galaxy.

Reception
Algis Budrys, describing Delany as "the best science-fiction writer in the world," praised Nova as "highly entertaining to read" and commended Delany's integration of his sociopolitical extrapolation into his story, his accomplished characterization, and his "virtuosity" in presenting the novel's "classically posed scientific puzzle."

Characters
 Lorq Von Ray. Lorq is the scion of the wealthy Von Ray family, the most powerful clan in the Pleiades Federation. Originally a carefree playboy, Lorq is drawn into his family's feud with the Reds and, as a result, becomes obsessed with finding Illyrion. When Prince Red attacks him as a teenager at a fabulously opulent party in Isle St.-Louis in Paris, he scars Lorq's face badly; but Lorq refuses to remove the scarring for the rest of the novel and as a result carries an air of menace.As the book unfolds, Lorq learns that his family was founded by pirates, who killed members of the Red family in previous generations in order to keep the Pleiades free of Earth-based corporations, although Lorq's ancestors did so with the support of the Pleiades' citizens. The Reds, however, still carry a grudge.Although Lorq Von Ray is described as looking between forty-five and fifty years old, according to the dates in the book he is barely thirty. This may have been a mathematical mistake on Delany's part: in the book's first edition there are several such errors, such as the numbering of the centuries: the year 1850 is in the middle of the nineteenth century, not the eighteenth. The year 2375 is in the middle of the twenty-fourth century, not the twenty-third. But these mistakes have been corrected in more recent editions. A possible explanation for Lorq's age is the Mouse's speculation that Lorq is "aged, not old". He has a Norwegian father and a Senegalese mother from Earth.
 The Mouse. This is the nickname for Pontichos Provechi, a young Gypsy from Earth, who, by age 18, has led an extremely varied life, and is just beginning to work in a starship navigation crew. He also entertains people by creating illusions and music with his "sensory syrynx" (a sound, scent, and hologram projector).
 Katin Crawford. Katin is an intellectual from Earth's moon, who received a liberal arts education at Harvard University and who has worked till now at a series of unfulfilling clerical positions. Katin is a loner. His passion is to explore various moons across the Solar System. He also aspires to write a novel, for which he constantly records notes, although the form is obsolete by the time Nova takes place. The word "novel" is, incidentally, etymologically related to the word "nova." Both come from the Latin novum, which means "something new." Sometimes Katin annoys his colleagues by going off on long lectures on any number of topics; in this capacity, he is sometimes comic, even while acting as the novel's expository voice.
 Sebastian and Tyÿ. This wandering, working couple consists of Sebastian, a powerful-looking man who is nonetheless gentle—he keeps a number of unusual pets with him, his "flapping black gillies"—and his companion, Tyÿ, a quiet mysterious woman and tarot-card reader. Like many of Delany's characters, Sebastian is racially mixed: Although he has Asian features, his hair is naturally blond. Both are from the Pleiades and consider it an honor to work for the Von Ray family.
 Lynceos and Idas. These twin brothers are of African descent, but one is an albino. Eventually we learn they are two members of a set of triplets. Having been born and grown up in the Outer Colonies, all three brothers had a tendency to use drugs and make mischief. As a result of one of their pranks, they ended in a type of indentured servitude and were forced to work in the colonies' Illyrion mines. (Such arrangements are common at that time to "recruit" workers for the mines.) The two talk in tandem. Jokingly Katin calls them a pair of "glorified salt and pepper shakers." Their names come from the twins who were among Jason's crew in his ancient quest for the fleece. Lynceos means lynx-like, i.e., sharp-eyed. Idas suggests someone from the pleasant fields of Mt. Ida.
 Prince Red. The scion of the Earth-based Red family, Prince was born with only one arm. In place of the other, he wears an artificial limb, which has unnatural strength. Its grip can compress sand into quartz crystals, which he can throw with the force of bullets. A troublemaker from birth (in his youth, he was forced constantly to shift schools because of discipline problems), he detests Lorq for numerous reasons, some of which he is not consciously aware of.Because of the power his artificial arm gives him, Prince can become extremely violent if anyone so much as mentions his deformity. As a little boy he sprains Lorq's mother's wrist when, innocently, she asks for his hand to take him home when he has gotten into mischief after dark with the other children.
 Ruby Red. Prince's younger sister, Ruby, is a quiet-spoken woman, who appears to be completely under Prince's control. As an adolescent, Lorq falls in love with her, but she rebuffs him because of their families' hostile histories.Prince appears to have an unhealthy attachment to his sister—which, often, she seems to reciprocate. While their father, Aaron, is still alive at the time of the novel and in charge of the Red's vast industrial holdings, Prince and Ruby are the most visible members of the Red clan.
 Dan. An Australian drifter and former member of Lorq's crew, Dan is the first to suggest to Lorq how a nova might be a source for Illyrion. Unfortunately, by the beginning of the novel, an accident on the first mission has damaged his senses and probably his sanity. He kills himself soon into the book, and most of his appearances take place in flashbacks.

The book's third chapter (of seven) is basically a long flashback that shows Lorq and Prince's childhoods and the political background against which the story takes place. Lorq first meets Prince and Ruby when they are all youngsters, during an attempt by their parents to end the feud between the families. The meeting ends, however, in disaster and embarrassment, and the fundamentally cruel natures of both Prince and his father Aaron—as well as the senior Von Ray's innate love of violence—become clear.

Motifs
Nova has a number of character motifs in common with Delany's later literary and literary-pornographic works: the Mouse, a damaged artist who wears one shoe as does the Kid in the later Dhalgren; Katin, an intellectual and writer who attempts to record the events around him; the twins Lynceos and Idas, one black, the other albino; and Dan, a barefoot derelict, with a rope holding up his pants.

The novel, storyline, and themes of Nova are multilayered and complex, and lend themselves to numerous interpretations. As the critic Judith Merrill wrote at the book's publication:

Here are (at least some of) the ways you can read Nova: As fast-action far-flung interstellar adventure; as archetypal mystical/mythical allegory (in which the Tarot and the Grail both figure prominently); as modern myth told in the SF idiom . . . The reader observes, recollects, or participates in a range of personal human experience including violent pain and disfigurement, sensory deprivation and overload, man-machine communion, the drug experience, the creative experience – and interpersonal relationships which include incest and assassination, father-son, leader-follower, human-pet, and lots more.’’(Judith Merril, 1968).

Space operaNova takes place in a standard space opera setting with many of the features and tropes peculiar to the genre. Conscientiously the novel emulates many earlier and popular science fiction works.

Delany makes an offhand reference to Isaac Asimov's Foundation trilogy (a random planet is named "Trantor"). Additionally, in one scene, a character has a false tooth with poison hidden in it, a classical trope from many espionage stories, which Frank Herbert's Dune had employed three years before. (Unlike in Dune, in Nova it doesn't work.)

There is also a strong similarity in names between the scientist, Ashton Clark, who, in Nova, has invented the cyborg plugs and sockets centuries before, which pervade the novel, and the name of the fantasy and science fiction writer from the 'thirties and 'forties, Clark Ashton Smith.

Prince's ability to squeeze sand into glass and quartz fragments strongly parallels the power of many action heroes (most notably Superman), and the idea of aristocratic families feuding in space is found in numerous other space opera novels. The character of Katin is partially written to resemble the classic "bore" in science fiction literature—a character who constantly gives lectures and explanations to describe the universe of the book. In Nova, however, Katin is constantly ridiculed for filling this role and on occasion is used for comic relief.

In keeping with this sort of game-playing, in a scene that takes place in a vast museum, the Alkane, in the city of Phoenix on the planet Vorpis, at one point Lorq and Katin hurry through the "FitzGerald Salon," clearly based on the actual "Rubens Salon" in the Louvre Museum in Paris—after the Mona Lisa and the Raft of the Medusa, probably the Louvre's most impressive holdings.

The artist Russell FitzGerald was a good friend of Delany's and did five book and magazine covers for him (the cover for the first edition of Nova and the cover for the Magazine of Fantasy and Science Fiction edition of "We, in Some Strange Power's Employ, Move on a Rigorous Line" [1968]) and the three covers for the English paperback edition of the three volumes of Delany's Fall of the Towers trilogy. He is thanked at the beginning of Nova, along with their mutual friend, the poet Helen Adam, for helping with "Grail and Tarot lore." FitzGerald had a basement studio on East 2nd Street in New York City's East Village, modeled after a similar studio used by the Victorian artist and illustrator Aubrey Beardsley and known to FitzGerald's friends as "the Black Studio." There FitzGerald worked on a series of large canvases similar in size to the ones by Rubens that line the walls of the Rubens Salon. Delany often visited the Black Studio and even worked there on Nova in his notebook, while FitzGerald worked on his great hyperreal paintings, the two of them drinking white wine together.

The museum lamp in Nova that allows paintings to be viewed under the same order of light in which they were created grew out of their studio conversations. Eventually FitzGerald did an entire tarot deck, which his friends referred to as "the Nova tarot." FitzGerald and "the Black Studio" are the model for the character "Proctor" and his studio—and the art objects contained in it—in Delany's novel Equinox (1973). For many years Delany hoped that a FitzGerald painting called Götterdämarung, which he'd painted over the same months as Delany wrote Nova, would eventually make a color cover for the novel. Alas, it never happened.

The tarot and the grail
Within the future society, reading the Tarot is considered both scientific and accurate. The Mouse is actually ridiculed as old-fashioned and uneducated for his skepticism about such things.

Much of the story revolves around a tarot reading Tyÿ gives Lorq at the beginning of the second mission, in which she rather successfully predicts the stakes and outcome. For example, The Tower appears, indicating that a powerful family (presumably the Reds or Von Rays) will fall, and the large number of pentacles indicates wealth. Prince and Ruby are represented by the King of Swords and the Queen of Swords, respectively. An anomaly in the reading, however, occurs when Tyÿ drops The Sun—which Lorq considered to represent a nova—and the Mouse pockets it, thus making it impossible for Tyÿ's reading to include this card.

Smaller Tarot readings dot the rest of the novel. As a young child, Lorq receives a reading indicating a death in his family: within a month, his Uncle Morgan is assassinated. Likewise, Lorq's Aunt Cyana (Morgan's widow) has Lorq choose a single Tarot card for insight: it is The Hanged Man, reversed, indicating that Lorq will succeed in his quest, but at a very high price.

Delany makes it clear that the Tarot should not be used for outright prediction. As Katin tells the highly skeptical Mouse: "[T]he cards don't actually predict anything. They simply propagate an educated commentary on present situations[.]" (Nova, 112). "[Tarot cards] only become superstitious when they are abused, employed to direct rather than guide and suggest." (Nova, 113) But, as the plot develops, sometimes it's difficult to distinguish clearly between useful "guiding" and abusive (superstitious) "directing."

The story of scarred Captain Von Ray's obsessive quest for a nova with his crew of outcasts recalls Melville's tale of wounded Captain Ahab's search for the white whale in Moby-Dick. (In a 1971 article about the current state of Science Fiction, Time Magazine writer R. Z. Shepherd wrote, "[Nova] suggests Moby-Dick at a strobe-light show.") In Nova, the events are interpreted by Katin as a quest for the Holy Grail, with Illyrion playing the part of the Grail itself. As in the Grail story, there is a failed attempt to gain it, and someone must make a major self-sacrifice (in Nova, his sanity and senses) in order to succeed.

Katin is constantly trying to find a plot for his novel, and finally decides to use Lorq's adventures with Prince and Ruby—immediately noticing the correspondences with the Grail archetype. By the end of the novel, it becomes clear that Nova is the book Katin will eventually write.

Creativity, art, change, and stagnation
Although the novel takes place in the 32nd century, the society within it is described as highly stagnant, even taking into account the spread of interstellar travel and cyborging. Often, however, the book suggests that those minor characters who repeatedly make this judgment are simply looking for symptoms of change and vitality in the wrong parts of society—a theme Nova shares with Alfred Bester's The Stars My Destination.

Cyana Von Ray Morgan, who is Lorq's aunt and a curator at humanity's largest museum, remarks that one-fourth of the displays at her museum are devoted to the Twentieth century, much the way major museums in Europe and the United States for the last hundred or so years might seem—to some—to have devoted a disproportionate amount of their space to Greek and Roman artifacts. She justifies this by saying that, despite all the progress made by mankind, the Twentieth Century encompasses the greatest change in humanity's fundamental situation: "At the beginning of that amazing century, mankind was many societies living on one world; at its end, it was basically what we are now: an informatively unified society that lived on several worlds." (Nova, 156)

In short, within the fictional future of Nova, humanity began to colonize space by the end of the Twentieth Century. A few centuries later, and cyborg implants were invented. The combination of increasingly cheap Illyrion (the fuel of starships) and universally adaptable implants has created, by the time of the novel, a highly mobile and transient work force and population.

This mobile population has a drawback, however. In a pseudo-intellectual argument raised throughout the novel, characters make reference to a "lack of cultural solidarity" (a concept that vaguely resembles the idea of cultural capital). Because the population is constantly on the move, there is no shared culture, nor have there been any successful attempts to create new broad-based artistic and cultural movements since the end of the Twentieth Century.

Characters make frequent references to 20th-century culture: at Prince's party in Paris (which takes place in the year 3162), a group of entertainers start performing a song by The Mamas & the Papas. Katin makes an offhand remark that indicates the board game Monopoly (which was invented during the early 20th century) is still in existence and has even been adapted to the future society. When he needs to name a "Renaissance Man," Katin mentions Bertrand Russell, despite the passage of more than a millennium since Russell died.

In Cyana Morgan's museum, in addition to the predominance of Twentieth Century-based exhibits, within a hall of paintings, Katin notices that many of the works share the same subjects—and, in many cases, the same names—even though the tags clearly indicate the paintings were created centuries apart, and on different planets. The most famous art collection in the museum is actually a forgery of an existing set of works, and the forgeries are considered more popular and valuable than the originals.

The main interest of the book—unusual for a science fiction novel—is the two approaches to art characterized by the Mouse and Katin. In playing on his sensory syrynx, the Mouse is spontaneous, improvisatory, highly personal and immediately emotional. While he uses whatever material is around him as the basis for his art, the Mouse's creations on his syrynx are, however, beautiful, ephemeral and disposable. In Nietzsche's terms, he is a Dionysian artist. Katin on the other hand is (again in Nietzsche's terms) an Apollonian artist. He is deeply intellectual, highly theoretical, largely impersonal, and concerned with the richness and complexity of the statement his artwork will make in terms of history. The irony of his approach is that, for all the hundreds of thousands of words he has dictated into his recorder about his theory of what the novel should be and do, he is still looking for a subject—a story—that is important enough in historical terms to stand up under all his theorizing.

When the Mouse's approach gets out of control, as the novel dramatizes in one climactic sequence, the instruments of art become murderous weapons. When Katin's approach gets out of hand, the result is paralysis and silence.

The conclusion the Mouse arrives at to Katin's problem—and for the reader appreciating the book on this level, it should be no surprise—is that Lorq's quest itself, which will revise the power structure of the entire galaxy, is the historically proper subject for Katin's novel, at the same time that Katin realizes he must learn how to employ some of the Mouse's immediacy, spontaneity, and energy. It does not hurt that, by the end of Nova, Lorq's quest has achieved the shape of a classical tragedy: Lorq has had to sacrifice his senses in the same way that Dan—at the start of the book—has already lost his; and in the way that the Mouse has been so afraid might happen to him. In many ways the novel is about perception itself—its value, its pleasures, the information it allows us to access, the sense it allows us to make of the rich and colorful social universe.

The novel refers repeatedly to a historic "Vega Republic," presumably among the worlds circling the star Vega, which flourished several centuries prior to the novel's beginning. At one point, apparently, the Republic staged an uprising and attempted to declare both political and cultural autonomy from Earth. During those years the Vegans created a new and different style in furniture, fabrics, and architecture. Many of their artists, musicians, and writers produced highly distinctive work that, in later years, caught the imagination of intellectuals in both Draco and the Pleiades. Before Nova begins, however, the Vega Republic uprising was violently suppressed, and Katin claims that the ability to identify remnants of Vegan culture has become nothing but an intellectual "parlor game."

As the quest continues, soon Lorq drops the rationalizations for the Red/Von Ray vendetta, except for the fact that his actions, for better or worse, will produce a major cultural shift in humanity, even though nobody can tell what that change will be, or if it will be a positive or negative one.

Race
The story's main character, Lorq, is Afropean. His father is of Norwegian descent, and his Earth-born mother is Senegalese.

The residents of the Pleiades Federation (and the Outer Colonies) overall are an extremely mixed racial population. In addition to appearances, characters from the Pleiades sometimes have names that indicate a mixed racial heritage. For example, one of Lorq's childhood friends is named “Yorgos Satsumi,” which contains a clearly Japanese last name, but a first name that is decidedly Greek.

This is in sharp contrast to the Earth-centered Draco society, where the leaders tend to be uniformly Caucasian. Individuals from Earth also tend to have extremely "WASPish" names. For example, a character named "Brian" is eventually revealed (at least, in the 2002 edition) to have the full name "Brian Anthony Sanders." Moreover, according to the Mouse, Earth still has problems with racism: he recalls seeing Gypsies lynched when he was younger.

Ironically, although this racial diversity is considered one of the novel's most innovative features, at the time of its first publication (1968), the inclusion of minority characters proved to be a liability due to the racism ingrained in American culture at the time (see Publishing Status below).

Man and machine, society and alienation
The society of Nova is in a pre-revolutionary state. Economic tensions have created a feud between the "new money" Von Ray family and the "old money" Red family, both of whom have a large stake in intergalactic transportation. Shortly before the novel's events (within the lifetime of Lorq's father), the Pleiades region achieved political autonomy from Earth/Draco, and is now an independent federation. At the time of the novel, citizens of the Outer Colonies are beginning to support the idea of independence as well.

In a passage in Chapter Three, the elder Von Ray interprets the tensions in terms of social class, with each major galactic region representing one of the three traditional social classes:
 The Draco Empire, centered on Earth, was the earliest area to be colonized. As such, this colonization was largely controlled and subsidized by large governments and corporations from Earth (most notably, Red Shift Ltd.). Because of this, Draco is largely controlled by the upper class, which retains strong cultural and economic ties to Earth.
 The Pleiades Federation was founded, according to Lorq's father, by a "comparatively middle class" movement, primarily individuals and small businesses that wished to cut ties from Earth and maintain their independence. The main reason for this was that, although the region as a whole was far from Draco, its many habitable planets are located relatively close to each other, resulting in much cheaper transportation costs. The citizens were so dedicated to keeping out Earth influence that they hired Lorq's great-great grandfather (the founder of the Von Ray clan) to kill any representative of Earth-based megacorporations who tried to stake a claim. As a result, the Pleiades remained distant from Draco, and eventually declared independence without much Earth-based interference.
 The Outer Colonies were colonized solely because of the prospects of Illyrion mining, as the worlds within the region are not particularly hospitable to human habitation. Because of this, large companies subsidized the migration of mine workers to the region, often using trickery, dubious legal measures, and false promises. As a result, the Outer Colonies are almost entirely populated by men and women from the working class and lower classes, who had few other prospects.

One thing all characters have in common is their cyborging. Individuals who cannot or will not accept these implants are effectively removed from society. The Mouse, for instance, mentions that his people (the Gypsies) refused the implants and, as a result, were treated with intolerance and even killed on Earth.

Prince's anger over his artificial arm, while irrational on the surface, is eventually hypothesized to have been caused by its effect on his ability to cyborg. Generally, a person has a total of five implants, two of which are located in the wrists. Since Prince was born with only one arm, he cannot fully connect himself with a machine.

Although the society seems on the edge of a revolution (or some other unspecified major change), the future of the novel is optimistic. As Katin reveals in one of his expository monologues, the problem of labor alienation has been overcome through the use of technology: practically all humans have cyborg socket implants that allow them to interface directly with the machines they use. These sockets are highly adaptable. Characters plug them into everything from small vacuum cleaners to the navigational systems of starships. By directly interfacing with the machines, workers are able to identify with their work, and the result is greater psychological wellbeing and less labor alienation.

Sex and incestNova was written prior to Delany's turn to sexuality as a major focus of his work. Nevertheless, the novel suggests several sexual subtexts. In the same way that a homoerotic current informs the relationship Melville describes between Captain Ahab and the cabin boy Pip in Moby-Dick, a similar undercurrent vibrates through the scenes between Captain Von Ray and the Mouse.

Throughout the novel, the intelligent and beautiful Ruby remains both loyal and subservient to her brother, Prince, even to the extent of going against her own feelings. Their relationship strongly suggests an incestuous nature. Prince refuses to allow her to interact with Lorq. In turn, Ruby maintains a close emotional attachment to Prince, one that, in a suggestive scene near the novel's end, proves disastrous.

Assassination, pain, and violence
In Nova, a culturally iconic political assassination has taken place. The advanced technology at the time allowed millions of people throughout the universe to experience the sensations and emotions of the victim (Secretary Morgan, the leader of the Pleiades Federation) as he died—and, directly afterwards, the emotions of his widow (and Lorq Von Ray's aunt), Cyana Von Ray Morgan. The murder was brutal: Morgan was publicly garroted at his second inauguration, and almost decapitated. Although the assassination was eventually revealed to be the work of a single man, ("Underwood"), for a period of time afterwards, many popular conspiracy theories were developed. To deal with her grief—and that of Pleiades citizens—Cyana Morgan adopted an extremely stoic posture and slowly retreated from the public eye.

This death is clearly a dramatic rewriting of the November 1963 "televised" assassination of President John F. Kennedy in Dallas, Texas, which had taken place only five years before Nova was published. Cyana Von Ray Morgan, the widow, strongly resembles Kennedy's wife Jacqueline Bouvier Kennedy in her responses, her appearance, and her interest in art.

Lorq, Prince, and Ruby—all heirs of wealthy clans who grew up in luxury—live what Lorq refers to as "meaningless" lives, indulging in sex, expensive hobbies (e.g. space-yacht racing), and partying. Lorq's transformation begins when, in a physical fight, Prince scars Lorq's face deeply with his artificial hand. Later in the novel, both Lorq and the Mouse attack Prince and Ruby, causing them great pain. As the novel nears completion, Ruby remarks that, prior to that event, neither she nor her brother had a true concept of what pain was really like; neither of them truly fathomed the importance of their actions and the feud until they were personally hit by it.

Practically all the socially powerful characters have violent natures, which often they try to hide or repress. Despite the elder Von Rays' attempts to end the feud, make peace with Aaron Red, and have their children become friends, the Von Rays cannot escape the fact that the family wealth and status were based on piracy and murder. Although outwardly Aaron Red appears harmless (he is described as bald, portly, and easily embarrassed) and he seems to be friends with members of the Von Ray family, events can bring out his natural violence and reveal him as an abusively indulgent father.

The novel hints at these buried emotions, when, for example, the Von Ray and Red families meet in the Outer Colonies at a reconciliatory reception. Seven-year-old Prince uses his artificial arm and its strength to kill Lorq's mother's pet bird in front of Lorq and Ruby. Later that night, the adults leave to watch the future equivalent of a cock fight, but with winged reptiles rather than roosters. The novel's violence gathers force in an unexpected eruption from Prince against Lorq at his party in Paris; much of the novel tries to explain the origins of this rage.

Both rage and pain are eventually recognized by the mature characters to have been a necessary component of their lives. Lorq realizes that, without Prince's attack to 'wake him up,' he would have gone on with a carefree life; he maintains his scar as a reminder of this. The successful completion of Lorq's quest has an extremely painful outcome for Lorq personally. As well, now that the need for Illyrion mines is gone, we know, the Outer Colonies will collapse socially and economically. The Red heirs fought for the status quo; only near the end of the novel do they experience the pain that goes along with the realization of what Lorq is trying to do.

==Nova's influence==Nova is considered one of the major forerunners of the cyberpunk movement. It prefigures, for instance, cyberpunk's staple trope of human interfacing with computers via implants.

While the New Wave of science fiction was concentrating on near-future science fiction stories and the highly subjective exploration of "inner space," in 1968, the year it was published, Nova seemed a deliberate throw-back to traditional space opera—and space opera at its grandest and most operatic.

While reviews in the American professional science fiction magazines, The Magazine of Fantasy and Science Fiction and Galaxy, by Judith Merril and Algis Budrys, respectively, were highly praiseful, the review in the New Wave outlet, England's New Worlds, by M. John Harrison, while acknowledging the skill and energy with which it had been written, called the book a "waste of time and talent."

The novel has always been popular with readers, many of whom have found it, for all its social subtleties, a roller-coaster of a read; but it took a decade-and-a-half for cyberpunk writers and readers to begin praising its handling of drugs, tarot cards, and its off-hand presentation of racial variety, its narrative energy and sense of historical sweep, and finally its exploration of the relationship between politics and art—indeed, for the cyberpunk writers it soon became an iconic text. Characters like the Mouse, Lynceos, Idas, Tyÿ, Sebastian, and even Katin can be seen as hippies, with itinerant lifestyles and drugs. As well, the design and effect of the Mouse's sensory syrinx has an overall feel of an expanded 1960s light show, of the sort that had then begun to accompany traditional rock concerts.

Writer William Gibson claimed to be greatly influenced by Delany, and his novel Neuromancer includes allusions to Nova. While Delany's vision of the future is optimistic, however, the cyberpunk movement has a distinctly dystopic outlook. Gibson's novel includes a character, Peter Riviera, introduced (like the Mouse) in Istanbul, with the same holographic projection powers (although via implants) as the Mouse in Nova; but Gibson's character is a psychopath. Likewise, Gibson includes a character who awkwardly wears only one shoe; this character (Ashpool) is an insane killer.

Several episodes of "Futurama" feature the "holophoner," a musical instrument that is very difficult to play, and projects holographic imagery to accompany the music.

Publishing status

Despite its status, reputation, and influence on science-fiction as a genre, for a dozen years after 1990 (the date of Bantam Books' final 14th printing), Nova was out of print. Hardcover copies were highly prized. Not until 2002 did Vintage Books rerelease it.

Over the years before Nova appeared, Delany had already won the Nebula Award twice for best science fiction novel of the year: Babel-17 had gained the award in 1967 (in a tie for best novel of 1966 with Daniel Keyes's Flowers for Algernon, a.k.a. Charly). The Einstein Intersection won him the award the following year in 1968 (for best novel of 1967).

While awaiting publication by Doubleday, Nova was submitted to Analog editor John W. Campbell for potential serialization. Campbell rejected the novel, saying in a telephone conversation with Delany's agent that, though he had enjoyed the book, he did not feel his magazine's readership "would be able to relate to a black main character."
Because there was no magazine serialization, however, in its first six months the novel did not get the initially wide exposure to readers that might have helped gain it a Hugo Award—though it was nominated and soon regularly referred to as "the perfect science fiction novel". In the pages of Galaxy Magazine (Analog's rival), the August after it appeared, resident critic Algis Budrys would write, "Samuel R. Delany, right now, as of this book, Nova, not as of some future book or some accumulated body of work, is the best science-fiction writer in the world, at a time when competition for that status is intense. I don't see how a writer can do more than wring your heart while explaining how it works. No writer can"—heady praise for the work of a young man completed before his twenty-sixth birthday.

The Vintage edition of the novel corrects some minor mistakes in the original version. It also adds an entire passage that does not appear in any of the older published versions.

In the Vintage edition, Delany includes a passage in which Prince Red brags about how he is responsible for the death of Brian, a character who disappears, in earlier editions, after a single chapter. In the Vintage edition, toward the end of the book Prince describes how, using his wealth and power, and with no more provocation than a careless comment Brian once made about Prince's arm, Prince systematically destroyed Brian's life, until Brian became homeless and died of exposure. Prince claims that he has killed some two dozen others in a similar manner for similar reasons.

This passage significantly alters Prince's characterization. In earlier editions, the worst that could be said of Prince is that he had been "spoiled" and had a violent temper. The new material turns him into a remorseless murderer and adds a moral component to Lorq's quest absent in the earlier versions. If Prince defeats Lorq, the most powerful man in the galaxy will be a psychopathic killer.

The above passage is in the original typescript of Nova, however. It is also in Delany's handwritten version of the novel in his notebooks from 1967. Both are in the Delany Holdings on store in the Howard Gottlieb Archives at the Mugar Memorial Library of Boston University. Initially the writer omitted it before publication of the first edition, when a friend who had read the manuscript found that section too extreme. In later years Delany decided to return it to the novel, because he felt readers needed to know what happened to Brian, after he seems to vanish from the book.

Additionally, in the first edition of Nova'' it is unclear whether or not Lorq's parents are still alive by the time the novel ends: When Lorq begins his quest, his mother is already dying of a degenerative disorder, but at the end he makes no mention of them, nor does he try to contact them. However, in another (much briefer) passage added in the Vintage Books edition, related to the above, Lorq has a memory that implies both of his parents and Aaron Red (as did Dan and Brian) died during the past ten years. This is in neither the original typescript nor in the notebook version, and is a true addition.

References

External links
 Errata for Nova, approved by the author.
 Nova at Worlds Without End

1968 American novels
1968 science fiction novels
American science fiction novels
Novels by Samuel Delany
Doubleday (publisher) books
Cyborgs in literature
Fiction about the Solar System
Holy Grail in fiction
Fiction about novae
Space opera novels
Fictional museums
Novels about art and creativity
Social science fiction
Fiction about assassinations
Novels about drugs